Louis E. Boone (May 5, 1941 – January 7, 2005) was an American academic author. His works covered contemporary business and economics, and included university-level texts Contemporary Marketing and Contemporary Business (both with David L. Kurtz). His last residence was in Mobile, Alabama where he was the emeritus professor of business at the University of South Alabama. He owned the most extensive collection of Barbizon art in the United States, which is now part of the collection of the Mobile Museum of Art.

References

External links

1941 births
2005 deaths
University of South Alabama faculty